Finn Cousin-Dawson (born 4 July 2002) is a professional footballer who plays as a central defender and midfielder for Blyth Spartans on loan from Bradford City. Born in England, he represents Northern Ireland at youth international level.

Club career
Born in Stockton-on-Tees, Cousin-Dawson began his career with the Bradford City youth team. He moved on loan to Brighouse Town in November 2019, being recalled in January 2020, ahead of Bradford City's FA Youth Cup game against Chelsea. He turned professional in July 2020, signing a one-year contract.

He made his senior debut for Bradford City on 8 September 2020, in the EFL Trophy. In November 2020 he was one of a number of young Bradford City players playing in the first team who were praised by manager Stuart McCall. In December 2020 he spoke about the impact of coronavirus on football, including lack of fans at stadiums.

In January 2021 he signed a new contract with the club, running until summer 2024. In February 2021 he was dropped from the starting line-up after making 9 consecutive starts, with club joint manager Mark Trueman saying that Cousin-Dawson would help him cope with the mental and physical stress of first-team football. In April 2021 club joint manager Conor Sellars said he was happy for young players like Cousin-Dawson and Kian Scales to be playing regular first team football.

At the start of the 2021–22 season, it was announced that Cousin-Dawson would start the club's second game of the season, an EFL Cup game away to Nottingham Forest. He later said that his skills were improving, due in part to the expected standards of new manager Derek Adams.

In July 2022 he signed on loan for Spennymoor Town. Cousin-Dawson said that the loan was the "best thing" for him so that he could get regular playing time again. He was recalled by Bradford City in January 2023, with a view to making a further loan move. On 2 February, Cousin-Dawson returned to the National League North on an initial one-month loan deal with Blyth Spartans. Later that month the loan was extended until the end of the season.

International career
In March 2021 Cousin-Dawson was called-up to a training camp with the Northern Ireland under-21 team. He left early in order to return to Bradford City for a match. He received a second call up in May 2021. He made his under-21 international debut in June 2021 in a friendly against Scotland, and received a further call-up in August 2021.

In October 2021 Bradford City boss Derek Adams said that Cousin-Dawson's international experience was helping him mature as a player. He made two appearances for the under-21s that month. In November 2021 he made a further appearance, his first full international match.

He was recalled by Northern Ireland under-21s in March 2022. Club manager Mark Hughes said it was an opportunity for the player to impress him. Cousin-Dawson made one appearance, playing 90 minutes in a friendly against France, having not played in the earlier Under-21 Euro Qualifier against Slovakia.

Playing style
Primarily a centre-back, Cousin-Dawson has also played a right-back and was used as a holding midfielder for the first time on 6 October 2020 in the EFL Trophy, with Bradford City manager Stuart McCall suggesting it could become his permanent new position.

Career statistics

References

2002 births
Living people
English footballers
Association footballers from Northern Ireland
Northern Ireland under-21 international footballers
Bradford City A.F.C. players
Brighouse Town F.C. players
Spennymoor Town F.C. players
Blyth Spartans A.F.C. players
Association football defenders
Association football midfielders
English Football League players
Northern Premier League players
English people of Northern Ireland descent
National League (English football) players